John Hegarty is an Irish physicist and academic. He was elected 43rd Provost of Trinity College Dublin in 2001 for a ten-year term.

Life
He was born in Claremorris, County Mayo, and was educated locally at St Colman's College. He holds a BSc in Physics/Chemistry/Mathematics/Philosophy from St Patrick's College, Maynooth, a HDipEd also from Maynooth and a PhD from University College Galway.

Later academic career
Following a postdoctoral stay at the University of Wisconsin–Madison, he was a research scientist at Bell Labs, New Jersey for six years. He returned to Ireland in 1986 as Professor of Laser Physics in Trinity College. Producing over 140 publications, and developing a number of patents, he was a co-founder of Optronics Ireland and of campus company Eblana Photonics. He is a member of the Royal Irish Academy, the American Physical Society, the Optical Society of America, the Institute of Electronic and Electrical Engineers and Fellow of the Institute of Physics.

Prior to becoming Provost, Hegarty was Dean of Research and Head of the Physics Department.

Personal life
Hegarty is married to Neasa Ní Chinnéide, President of the European Bureau for Lesser-Used Languages, and they have two children, Cillian and Ciarán.

References

External links
Trinity College Dublin

Year of birth missing (living people)
Living people
Alumni of the University of Galway
Alumni of Oriel College, Oxford
Alumni of St Patrick's College, Maynooth
Irish physicists
Irish science writers
People from Claremorris
Provosts of Trinity College Dublin
Science teachers
20th-century Irish people
21st-century Irish people
University of Wisconsin–Madison alumni